Cyrtodactylus philippinicus, commonly known as the Philippine bent-toed gecko or Philippine bow-fingered gecko, is a species of gecko in family Gekkonidae.

Taxonomy
Cyrtodactylus philippinicus was first described by Austrian zoologist Franz Steindachner in 1867. It was named after its distribution in the Philippines. It is commonly known as the Philippine bent-toed gecko or Philippine bow-fingered gecko.

Distribution and habitat
Cyrtodactylus philippinicus is found throughout the northern Philippines. Introduced populations exist in Indonesia and Malaysia.

Behaviour
The species is nocturnal, active at night on rocks and boulders, over-hanging stumps and logs, or on root balls of large trees exposed by flowing water.

Status
Cyrtodactylus philippinicus has been evaluated as Least Concern by the IUCN due to its wide distribution, estimated large population, and stable population trend. It is mainly threatened by deforestation.

References

External links

Cyrtodactylus
Reptiles described in 1867
Reptiles of the Philippines
Endemic fauna of the Philippines